Louvel is a surname.  Notable people with the surname include:

 Éric Louvel (born 1962), French racing cyclist
 Jean-Marie Louvel (1900–1970), French engineer and politician
 Matis Louvel (born 1999), French cyclist
 Olivia Louvel, French composer